Gwanggyo (Kyonggi Univ.) Station is a metro station located in Gwanggyo, Yeongtong-gu, Suwon, Gyeonggi-do, South Korea. It is the only overground station in the line and built on the train depot.

The station is located directly in front of Kyonggi University and has many shops, restaurants and bars catering for university students around it.

References

Seoul Metropolitan Subway stations
Metro stations in Suwon
Railway stations opened in 2016